John or Jack Angus may refer to:

John Angus (minister) (1724–1801), English independent minister
John Angus (politician) (born 1943), politician in Manitoba, Canada
John Angus (children's advocate) (1948–2015) New Zealand historian, social worker and children's advocate
John Angus (footballer, born 1868), Scottish football goalkeeper who played for Everton
John Angus (footballer, born 1938) (1938–2021), Burnley and England footballer
Jack Angus (footballer, born 1868) (1868–1933), Scottish footballer, who played for Ardwick, Southampton and Fulham
Jack Angus (footballer, born 1909) (1909–1965), English footballer, who played for Exeter City from 1930 to 1948

See also